KindWords is a word processor for the Amiga computer. It allows for capturing of text, changing of text formatting, printing and many other aspects of desktop publishing.

References

See also

Amiga software
Word processors
1987 software